Late Night Line-Up was a pioneering British television discussion programme broadcast on BBC2 between 1964 and 1972.

Background
From its launch in April 1964, BBC2 began each evening's transmission with a programme called Line-Up, a ten-minute collection of reviews and previews of the channel's output, presented initially by Denis Tuohy. Although intended to draw attention to the considerable variety of original programming on BBC2, Line-Up was perceived as little more than a self-promotion exercise by the newspapers and the viewing public alike. Later in the same year, it was decided that Line-Up be replaced by something of a similar intention but with a more intellectual edge. Instead of a guided tour of BBC2's output, the new programme would be an open and candid discussion among invited guests, transmitted live after the 9.00 p.m. watershed. The new programme was named Late Night Line-Up and took over from Line-Up in September 1964.

The original theme tune was "Blue Boy" by Gerry Mulligan, replaced in the 1970s with a version of "Jordu" by the Dave Hancock Six.

Content
Denis Tuohy carried over his presenter's role from Line-Up but the new programme also brought Joan Bakewell to prominence as a broadcaster. An innovative feature of Late Night Line-Up was that it was deliberately scheduled as the last programme of the evening before closedown. This meant that the discussion need not be constrained by time; topics could be explored as far as the participants were willing to talk about them. (Another open-ended discussion programme, After Dark, began on Channel 4 fifteen years after Late Night Line-Up had ceased production.)

Broadcasting hours on British television were tightly controlled by the Postmaster General in the 1960s, and, for the majority of the 1960s, weeknights on BBC Two were limited to seven hours of programming in a day (excluding sport, political conferences, schools, religion and adult education which were exempt from the restrictions). As BBC Two would normally only air for 30 minutes in the morning at 11 am with Play School, this meant 6.5 hours were left over, with BBC Two normally starting their evening at 7.00pm, it meant Late-Night Line-Up could remain on the air until 1.30am if they so wished. It never happened, but the freedom for discussion, without worrying about exceeding the broadcasting day allowance made the programme very popular, especially with those who enjoyed watching television late at night, as BBC One and ITV generally closed down by 11.45pm each weeknight.

Participating in the discussion were TV personalities, subject experts and members of the public with relevant experience. For example, a real-life single mother might be invited to discuss a drama themed around single parenthood. Some panelists were deliberately chosen to talk about something outside their usual sphere of expertise. In one edition, the playwright Harold Pinter held his own on the subject of cricket, even when his fellow panelists were a distinguished cricketer and a cricket journalist.

Late Night Line-Up eventually went well beyond its initial remit of examining BBC2's output and came to incorporate interviews, live music and poetry performances and discussions of other TV channels (which meant ITV to all intents and purposes) and even current affairs issues. However, television criticism was always seen as the main focus, a fact which did not exactly endear the programme to the BBC's senior executives. Presenter Denis Tuohy quotes the then Head of Light Entertainment, Tom Sloan, as saying: "We now employ two kinds of broadcaster: those who make programmes and those who knock them.... Don't ask me why we do it."

On 26 May 2008 Late Night Line-Up returned for a special one-off edition as part of BBC Parliament's Permissive Night. Presented by Joan Bakewell, it featured discussion of the themes and programmes shown over the course of the evening and examined the liberalising legislation passed by Parliament in the late 1960s. Archive programmes shown included editions of Man Alive, Panorama, Twenty-Four Hours and Late Night Line-Up.

Crew of Late Night Line-Up
Rowan Ayers, producer
Michael Fentiman, producer
Joan Bakewell
Denis Tuohy
John Stone
Michael Dean
Nicholas Tresilian
Sheridan Morley
Tony Bilbow
Philip Jenkinson
Noel Picarda
Terry Hughes, director
Steve Turner, director
David Heeley, director
Colin Strong, director
Tom Corcoran, director
Granville Jenkins, director
Michael Appleton, producer
Richard Drewett, producer

Episode guide
As with many shows of its era, much of Late Night Line-Up no longer survives. This was not only due to videotapes being wiped, but the programme's usual live broadcast meant they were often not recorded at all. Luckily, some records do survive containing many dates and details of these shows.

1964
Interview With Miss Foyle – Foyle's Bookstore / Interview With Mr *Tompkins – Bookseller/ Screaming Lord Sutch Interview 27 August 1964
History of The Radio Times 23 September 1964

1965
Ralph Richardson Interview 3 February 1965
Ted Ray 9 March 1965
Robert Morley On Exercise 18 March 1965
Peter Sellers Interview 19 March 1965
Duke Ellington 26 March 1965
BBC2 Opening Night Delay/BBC2 Critics/ Rick Jones 20 April 1965
Ken Dodd / Allan Smethurst And Cluff's Dog 14 May 1965
Debussy / Marianne Faithfull / Writers World – Rowena Bingham / Oxford Union Debate – "This House Would Not Fight For Crown And Country" / David Jacobs' Daughter – Carol / Alan David and Peter Cook 22 May 1965
Z-Cars – Troy Kennedy Martin Interview 26 May 1965
Spies 26 June 1965
Bing Crosby 6 July 1965
Michael Crawford On Late Night TV 31 July 1965
Late Night Line-Up – In the Republic of Ireland 4 August 1965
Robin Day Interview 8 August 1965
Virginia and Bob Manry 27 August 1965
Kristin Brihn / Donovan 8 September 1965
The Pistol Preview 10 September 1965
Lydia Sokolova Interview 13 September 1965
Willy Brandt Preview 15 September 1965
Douglas Bader 17 September 1965
William Taynton Talks About John Logie Baird 2 October 1965
Tony Hancock Interview 5 October 1965
A To Z-Cars 8 October 1965
Hal Roach Interview / Julie Felix / Peter Ustinov 16 October 1965
TV Review / Alan Bennett – Vicar Sketch / Tommy Makem and The Clancy Brothers 22 October 1965
Arthur Askey 29 October 1965
Line-Up Review 5 November 1965
Maurice Denham / Kenneth Horne and Richard Murdoch 14 November 1965
Juliette Gréco Interview 20 November 1965
Peter Ustinov Interview 22 November 1965
Diahann Carroll 26 November 1965
George Orwell's 1984 – TV Adaptations 27 November 1965 – interviews by Michael Dean with Rudolph Cartier, Nigel Kneale, Peter Cushing, Yvonne Mitchell, Christopher Morahan, David Buck and Jane Merrow
Dr Jacob Bronowski 2 December 1965
A Child's Christmas in Wales 24 December 1965

1966
Line Up Rugby / Yugoslav TV Film / Shirley Abicair 1 January 1966
The Sea And Shipping 5 January 1966
Line-Up Review – Comedy – What The Papers Say 7 January 1966
War Films/ Bryan Forbes 11 January 1966
Ivor Cutler / Clifford Davis Conjuring Tricks/TV Critics 13 January 1966
Line -Up Review 14 January 1966
Line Up Rugby/ Not Only But Also 15 January 1966
Joseph Losey / Whole Scene Going 19 January 1966
Plunder – A Portrait Of Gilbert Harding 23 January 1966
Laurence Harvey 5 February 1966
Softly, Softly / Richard Rodney Bennett 9 February 1966
Ivor Mairants / Margaret Rutherford Interview / The Idiot 12 February 1966
Burl Ives Interview 13 February 1966
Sammy Gray Song / Arnold Ridley / Robert Harbin Trick/ Edmund Blunder 14 February 1966
Line-Up Review 25 February 1966
The Puffer 4 March 1966
Barbra Streisand 17 March 1966
Vikki Carr / The Man from U.N.C.L.E. – Interview With Robert Vaughn And David McCallum 21 March 1966
Poetry / Sir Compton Mackenzie / Vintage Films 22 March 1966
John Faulkner Song / Great Metropolis Review / Peter O'Donnell Interview/ Mary Martin Interview 9 April 1966
Johnny and Fanny Cradock / James Robertson Justice / Tsai Chin Song 17 April 1966
N. F. Simpson 28 April 1966
Menuhin School – Yehudi Menuhin 1 May 1966
André Previn Interview 4 May 1966
N. F. Simpson Interview / Jimmy Edwards's Moustache / Breakfast TV / Donald Campbell Interview / Tonia Bern Interview 7 May 1966
Sammy Davis Jr. Interview 14 May 1966
Rolf Harris / Stanley Holloway / Jacques Loussier 23 May 1966
Leopold Stokowski 21 June 1966
Gay Hamilton / Leo McKern / Ivor Cutler 9 July 1966
Cambria – Cargo Under Sail 12 July 1966
Barbra Streisand 18 July 1966
War Against Crime Discussion / Boris Karloff Films / Clive Turner Predictions 2 August 1966
Alfred Hitchcock Interview 3 August 1966
Future And Effect of Television – Discussion 4 August 1966
From Madrid 5 August 1966
Hans And Lotte Hass 7 September 1966
Ken Russell At Work 23 September 1966
America Since The Bomb 7 October 1966
Tommy Trinder 11 October 1966
Plunder 15 October 1966
Coco the Clown 17 October 1966
D. W. Griffith / Cambridge University Jazz Ensemble 27 October 1966
Documentary Discussion 28 October 1966
Ex-RSM Ronald Brittain Interview 30 October 1966
Professor John Kenneth Galbraith 14 November 1966
Royal Variety Performance 20 November 1966
Discussion 21 November 1966
Alan Bennett Interview / Georg Solti Interview 23 November 1966
Dave Brubeck 1 December 1966
Chay Blyth And John Ridgway on rowing the Atlantic / Marine Biology Discussion 2 December 1966
Nancy Mitford on Louis XIV 5 December 1966
U Thant on Human Rights Day 10 December 1966
Propaganda Discussion / Billy Budd Opera Review 11 December 1966
Francis Chichester / Henry Livings Interview 12 December 1966
The Magic Roundabout / Philip Jenkinson Film Clips 13 December 1966
Erik Durschmied Cameraman 14 December 1966
Jack and the Beanstalk 22 December 1966

1967
Dick Gregory 2 January 1967
The Forsyte Saga 7 January 1967
Eurovision Song Contest Discussion 21 January 1967
John Hawkesworth on The Croxley Master  January 1967
Alan Melville Interview / Desert Island Discs 27 January 1967
Discussion on building industry / Gladys Aylward 1 February 1967
David Frost 4 February 1967
David Merrick, Broadway Producer 7 February 1967
Douglas Byng 13 February 1967
Gwyneth Jones 15 February 1967
Duke Ellington 19 February 1967
Pick of the Month 3 March 1967
The Pickwick Papers Extract / Robin Scott / Denis Touhy 9 March 1967
Dame Edith Evans 20 March 1967
George Browne, Trinidadian singer, sang "On the Road to Rainbow City" / Pierre Salinger / Children's Literature And Negroes 3 April 1967
Little Angel Theatre 10 April 1967
Westerns Discussion / Buddy Rich / Los Zafiros Group 20 April 1967
Eric Porter / Shakespeare's Sonnets 22 April 1967
The Golden Rose of Montreux 1967 28 April 1967
Phil Silvers Interview 1/5/67
James Cameron 4 May 1967
Jimi Hendrix Experience / Psychedelic Happening – Discussion/ Pierre Schoendoerffer 17 May 1967
Plunder – One Man And His Band (Harry Roy) 19 May 1967
Julian Slade 21 May 1967
Soldiers of the Widow 27 May 1967
Sir Gerald Cock Interview 1 June 1967
Gladys Cooper 11 June 1967
Homosexuality Discussion 14 June 1967
Manitas de Plata 15 June 1967
John Earle & Boat 'Helen'/ Arthur Negus 22 June 1967
1000th Edition – Peter Cook And Dudley Moore / Terry Jones / Robert Morley / Nyree Dawn Porter / Ned Sherrin / David Attenborough / Marion Montgomery 30 June 1967
A.P. Herbert Interview 3 July 1967
The Forsyte Saga 4 July 1967
Freddie Frinton / Mel Calman Cartoon on Sickness 10 July 1967
Gibson Square 1 August 1967
Battersea Park 10 August 1967
Alistair Cooke 14 August 1967
Electronics And TV / Rolling Stones / Discussion On Canadian Film Industry 24 August 1967
Empty Quarter Clip/ Colin Davis Interview 25 August 1967
Queen Mary II, Clyde steamer 26 September 1967
Dick Van Dyke 4 October 1967
Fred Friendly 26 October 1967
Barry Humphries / Franco Zeffirelli / Mable Hillery 27 October 1967
Philip Jenkinson Film Requests/ Edmund Leach 29 October 1967
Disc Jockeys 21 November 1967
L Marsland Gander Interview on Lord Reith / Like Father – 1/ Benjamin Britten / Like Father – 2 – Billy Cotton Snr and Bill Cotton Jnr 22 November 1967
Visual Effects – Jack Kine 25 November 1967 (included on the DVD release of the Doctor Who serial The Tomb of the Cybermen)
Mcgonagall poetry / Marion Montgomery / The Magic Roundabout /Philip Oakes On Petula Clark / Westerns In TV / East End Slums Discussion/ Michael Miles 3 December 1967
Yoko Ono Press Release / Malcolm Muggeridge And Kitty Muggeridge / Alirio Díaz – Guitarist 4 December 1967
Julie Felix Song / Dear Octopus Play / Black Dwarf Newspaper 7 December 1967
Arthur Askey 14 December 1967
Maurice Chevalier 31 December 1967

1968
Tyrone Guthrie 15 January 1968
Vera Lynn 21 January 1968
V.S. Pritchett 26 January 1968
Violet Bonham Carter (Lady Asquith) and Lady Stocks in Women's Suffrage 1 February 1968
Seán O'Casey 6 February 1968
Sir Arnold Lunn 11 February 1968
Dame Edith Evans 17 February 1968
Dame Marie Rambert 21 February 1968
Royal Court / Cue magazine 29 February 1968
Carlo Maria Giulini 3 March 1968
Lotte Reiniger / girls from Hammersmith County School give their views on public schools 9 March 1968
Graham Collier and Jazz 15 March 1968
Peter Brook Interview 19 March 1968
Kathleen Beehan Interview / Chaucer – The Canterbury Tales 20 March 1968
George Bernard Shaw 22 March 1968
Tim Buckley / Cicely Courtneidge And Jack Hulbert / Kingsley Martin Interview 1 April 1968
Oliver Knussen / Cockneyland 8 April 1968
Günter Grass Interview 11 April 1968
Derek Jones 12 April 1968
Bert Haanstra 16 April 1968
Brighton Postcards 26 April 1968
Xenia Field Interview 1 May 1968
Cecil Beaton Interview 9 May 1968Colour Me Pop – Katch 22 17 May 1968 Transmitted 18 May 1968
Alan Whicker 19 May 1968
Skye 24 May 1968
Robert Duncan Interview 27 May 1968
Alfred Wallis 29 May 1968
Bloomsbury Group 30 May 1968
Andy Williams 31 May 1968
Marcel Duchamp Interview 5 June 1968 – his only television interview
Alger Hiss 10 June 1968
Stephen Arlen On Sadler's Wells 17 June 1968Colour Me Pop – Small Faces 21 June 1968
Robert Bly 24 June 1968
Václav Havel 26 June 1968
Douglas Cooper: art critic on Picasso's work for theatre 27 June 1968
Bessie Love 29 June 1968
Paris Students – Posters 1 July 1968
Arthur Kopit 4 July 1968
Bob Hope 13 July 1968
Fun Fair 18 July 1968
Robert Wise 20 July 1968
Diaghilev 22 July 1968
Lynne Reid Banks 25 July 1968Cybernetic Serendipity exhibition 1 August 1968
Photography 3 August 1968
Rod Steiger 10 August 1968
Simone Signoret 12 August 1968
Peter Terson 19 August 1968
Peter Lawford 24 August 1968
Sissinghurst Castle 26 August 1968
Michael Macliammoir / Canterbury Tales – Musical 2 September 1968
Gary Player 9 September 1968
Elsie Randolph 11 September 1968Colour Me Pop – The Moody Blues 14 September 1968
Boris Karloff 21 September 1968
Genevieve Page 26 September 1968
Alfred Hitchcock 27 September 1968
Sandy Dennis 4 October 1968
Quintin Hogg 7 October 1968
Buddy Rich 9 October 1968Colour Me Pop – Honeybus – Clodagh Rodgers 12 October 1968Out in Arizona Where The Bad Men Are – The Making Of "The High Chaparral" 22 October 1968
Tom Hayden 28 October 1968
Jules Feiffer 31 October 1968
Ramón Novarro Interview 1 November 1968
Stuart Hood 5 November 1968
Gloria Swanson Interview 7 November 1968
Leif Erickson Interview/ First World War Posters 11 November 1968
Lester Pearson 14 November 1968
Eric Portman Interview 15 November 1968
Vivien Merchant Interview 19 November 1968
Rosemary Tonks and Maureen Duffy Two poets film. 20 November 1968
Cameron Mitchell Interview 25 November 1968
John Colicos and Kenneth Tynan on the Soldiers play 26 November 1968
Benny Goodman Interview 4 December 1968
Roland Topor Interview 5 December 1968The Young Visiters – Interview With Daisy Ashford 19 December 1968The Film World Past And Present – Brigitte Bardot Interview / Benny Goodman 20 December 1968Colour Me Pop – Bonzo Dog Doo-Dah Band 21 December 1968TV in the USA 22 December 1968

1969Colour Me Pop – The Move 4 January 1969
Aaron Copland 10 January 1969
Barbra Streisand 15 January 1969
Film Night – Rosemary's Baby 19 January 1969
George Plimpton 23 January 1969
Don Partridge and The Buskers 29 January 1969
Harold Pinter 3 February 1969
J. P. Donleavy Interview 5 February 1969
Georges Simenon Interview 9 February 1969The Forsyte Saga / Alan Randall / Philip Oakes On Tony Hancock 10 February 1969
Sir Kenneth Clark 28 February 1969
Sewell Stokes Interview On Isadora Duncan 4 March 1969
Michael Balcon 11 March 1969
John Hutton 18 March 1969
Film Night – Vincent Price Interview/ 23 March 1969
Film Night – Ice Station Zebra / Peter Finch 30 March 1969
Adrian Conan Doyle Interview 8 April 1969
Alvar Lidell 11 April 1969
Richard Hamilton Interview 14 April 1969In Celebration At The Royal Court 22 April 1969
Jack Valenti 1 May 1969
Sir Compton Mackenzie 9 May 1969
Hubert Humphrey 15 May 1969The Rector Of Stiffkey 20 May 1969
Film Night – Dimitri Tiomkin 25 May 1969
Dorset Horses 26 May 1969
Viveca Lindfors 30 May 1969
Sir Robert Mayer 4 June 1969The Promise 15 June 1969
Film Night – The Illustrated Man 22 June 1969
Alwin Nikolais 27 June 1969
Film Night – The Great Pismo 29 June 1969
Ronald Searle 2 July 1969
Francis Hastings 3 July 1969Colour Me Pop – Trapeze 5 July 1969
C.U.R.E. – Drugs 8 July 1969
Film Night – Moon Zero Two 13 July 1969
Film Night – Mervin Leroy 10 August 1969
Frank Cousins 21 August 1969
George Gershwin 22 August 1969
Film Night – The White Game / Run of the Arrow 24 August 1969
Jimmy Edwards Interview 29 August 1969I Am English I Was German But Above All I Was There 2 September 1969
Lillian Gish 3 September 1969
Tito Gobbi 4 September 1969
Bhaktivedanta Swami and Krishna devotees 16 September 1969
Ringo Starr 10 December 1969

1970When We Get To Calella It's Going To Be Great! 15 September 1970
Beethoven Trio 22 September 1970
Playgrounds 25 September 1970Nixon in Ireland 9 October 1970
William Kunstler Interview 12 October 1970The Gang Show 19 October 1970
Bessie Braddock 20 October 1970The Man Who Almost Won The National 29 October 1970
Bessie Braddock Obituary 13 November 1970
Laurence Olivier Interview 16 November 1970
Jeanne Moreau Talks About Orson Welles 19 November 1970
Gypsies 25 November 1970John Breslin On Homosexuality 4 December 1970
Lenny Bruce Stand Up Routine 18 December 1970
Colin Welland 21 December 1970Monty Python's Flying Circus  22 December 1970
Richard Huggett 23 December 1970Laughter in Despair – Loot 30 December 1970

1971One Man's Week – Russell Braddon 13 February 1971
Guinness Factory Workers Give Opinion About The Quality And Content of TV Programmes 19 February 1971One Man's Week – John Peel 20 February 1971
Galia von Meck 24 February 1971
Underground Soviet Magazines / The Music Lovers / Tambimuttu 26 February 1971One Man's Week – Godfrey Winn 27 February 1971One Man's Week – Gwyn Thomas 6 March 1971
Harold Lloyd Interview / BBC Bias / James Brown Interview 12 March 1971
Croagh Patrick Pilgrimage – The Reek 17 March 1971One Man's Week – P. J. Kavanagh 27 March 1971One Man's Week – Lord Chalfont 3 April 1971
Anthony Hopkins Interview 6 April 1971One Man's Week – Richard Ingrams 10 April 1971
Jimmy Wheeler 12 April 1971One Man's Week – Humphrey Lyttelton 17 April 1971The Future of Television – Debate 20 April 1971Television – An Assessment 21 April 1971Television – The Future – Cannes Exhibition 23 April 1971One Man's Week – J. B. Priestley 24 April 1971Hitler – A Fateful Friendship 30 April 1971One Man's Week – Barry Took 1 May 1971One Man's Week – Michael Foot 8 May 1971One Man's Week – Maurice Levinson 15 May 1971One Man's Week – Kenny Everett 29 May 1971
Fred Ball 31 May 1971One Man's Week – John Aspinall 12 June 1971One Woman's Week – Cleo Laine 19 June 1971
Colonel Otto Skorzeny Interview 26 July 1971We Have Met The Enemy And He Is Us 27 July 1971
Discussion On Oswald Mosley 28 July 1971
Museum Discussion 17 August 1971The People Plague 18 August 1971
Daniel Ellsberg 2 September 1971
Scottish Television 3 September 1971
Lotte Lehmann 16 September 1971
Professor Paul Ehrlich 24 September 1971
Dennis Potter interviewed about Traitor 14 October 1971
Ecology 20 October 1971
A 4th TV Channel – Discussion 22 October 1971
Martin Gilbert 25 October 1971
Fishing 5 November 1971
Civilia 22 November 1971
Dance Bands 13 December 1971

1972
Dutch Television 14 January 1972Up Sunday 16 January 1972
James Moffatt Interview 21 January 1972Up Sunday 23 January 1972
Discussion On Edward Albee 7 February 1972
International Guitar Competition 23 February 1972
Malcolm Macdonald 15 March 1972Up Sunday – Animation 26 March 1972
Women's Edition of Punch – Discussion 27 March 1972Up Sunday – Events of the Week 9 April 1972The Comedians with Charlie Williams, Bernard Manning, Ken Goodwin and John Hamp – Discussion 12 April 1972Everybody Likes Little Bit Xtr 14 April 1972Ecology – The Club of Rome 17 April 1972
Hetty King 19 April 1972Welcome Little Kangaroo – Eight Years of BBC2 21 April 1972Up Sunday 23 April 1972
Steven Scheuer Interview 5 May 1972Up Sunday – Events of the Week 7 May 1972
Sculpture 8 May 1972
James Joyce 11 May 1972
Harold Evans Interview 17 May 1972
Working men's clubs 24 May 1972Up Sunday 4 June 1972Ecology – So Far So Good 12 June 1972
World Ecology Conference 16 June 1972An Element in This Country Which I Need 12 July 1972
General Võ Nguyên Giáp Interview 28 July 1972
Lady Betjeman 1 August 1972All Our Own Work 2 August 1972
Little Richard Interview / Francis Fuchs Interview 4 August 1972
Cable Vision 9 August 1972
Claud Cockburn Interview 15 August 1972
Robert Maxwell Interview 22 August 1972
Bill Tidy Interview – The Fosdyke Saga 11 September 1972A Profile of Johnny Speight 15 September 1972Pornography, Sex And Freedom 29 September 1972
John Houston 9 October 1972
Sir Hugh Carleton Greene – Granada Lecture 18 October 1972
Vietnam Veterans 19 October 1972
Cecil Arthur Lewis 6 November 1972
Wole Soyinka Interview 20 November 1972
World Speed Trials 23 November 1972
Black September 7 December 1972
Press Photography 13 December 1972
Last Edition (of original run) – BBC2 Discussion With Michael Dean, Tony Bilbow, Sheridan Morley And David Attenborough 14 December 1972

1986
 Revived for a week to celebrate BBC TV's 50th Anniversary, with Michael Dean, Tony Bilbow, Joan Bakewell and Sheridan Morley.

2008
 Permissive Night 26 May 2008 – BBC Parliament discussion of 1960s liberalising legislation with Margaret Drabble, Peter Hitchens, Michael Howard MP and Lord Robert Winston.

 References 

External links
Late Night Line-Up returns to BBC Parliament
Screenonline on Late Night Line-up
Transcript of Ringo Starr interview on Late Night Line-up in 1969
BFI Database page on Late Night Line-Up
Off The Telly on 40 years of BBC2 (mentions LNL-U)
 Late Night Line-Up: A Child's Christmas in Wales'' BBC programme page

1964 British television series debuts
1972 British television series endings
1960s British television series
1970s British television series
BBC Television shows
Television series about television